Palintropa is a genus of moth in the family Gelechiidae.

Species
Palintropa peregrina Clarke, 1971 (from Rapa island)
Palintropa hippica Meyrick, 1913 (from Sri Lanka)

References

Gelechiinae
Taxa named by Edward Meyrick
Moth genera